George Robinson Swift (December 19, 1887 – September 10, 1972) was a U.S. senator from the state of Alabama. He was appointed to fill the term left by the death of John H. Bankhead, II and served in the Senate from June 15 to November 5, 1946, when a successor, John J. Sparkman, was elected. Swift was in the lumber business. He served in the Alabama House of Representatives 1931-1935 and the Alabama State Senate 1935-1939 and 1947–1951.

References 

1887 births
1972 deaths
Democratic Party members of the Alabama House of Representatives
Democratic Party Alabama state senators
Democratic Party United States senators from Alabama
20th-century American politicians